The 21st & E. Broad Historic District is a historic district on Broad Street in the Near East Side of Columbus, Ohio. The district was added to the Columbus Register of Historic Properties in 1988. Its properties were added to the E. Broad St. Multiple Resources Area on the National Register of Historic Places in 1986.

Contributing structures

See also
 18th & E. Broad Historic District
 National Register of Historic Places listings in Columbus, Ohio

References

National Register of Historic Places in Columbus, Ohio
Historic districts on the National Register of Historic Places in Ohio
1988 establishments in Ohio
Columbus Register properties
Historic districts in Columbus, Ohio
Broad Street (Columbus, Ohio)